Zarapicos (meaning Fox bites in English) is a municipality in the province of Salamanca,  western Spain, part of the autonomous community of Castile-Leon. It is located 20 kilometers from the city of Salamanca and as of 2016 had a population only 55 people. The municipality covers an area of 8 km².

The village lies 784 meters above sea level and the postal code is 37170.

References

Municipalities in the Province of Salamanca